Bahman Ghobadi (born 1 February 1969) is an Iranian Kurdish film director, producer and writer. He belongs to the  "new wave" of Iranian cinema.

Biography

He was born in Baneh, a Kurdish city in Iran. His family moved to Sanandaj in 1981. Ghobadi received a Bachelor of Arts in film directing from Iran Broadcasting College. After a brief career in industrial photography, Ghobadi began making short 8 mm films. His documentary Life in Fog won numerous awards. Bahman Ghobadi was assistant director on Abbas Kiarostami's The Wind Will Carry Us.

Bahman Ghobadi founded Mij Film in 2000, a company with the aim of production of films in Iran about its different ethnic groups. His first feature film was A Time for Drunken Horses (2000), the first Kurdish film produced in Iran. The film won the Caméra d'Or at the Cannes Film Festival. His second feature was Marooned in Iraq (2002), which brought him the Gold Plaque from the Chicago International Film Festival. His third feature, Turtles Can Fly, followed in 2004, winning the Glass Bear and Peace Film Award at the Berlin International Film Festival and the Golden Shell at the San Sebastian International Film Festival.

In 2006, Ghobadi's Half Moon won the Golden Shell at the San Sebastian International Film Festival. Iran's renowned actors Golshifteh Farahani, Hassan Poorshirazi and Hedyeh Tehrani acted in this movie. The music of the movie was made by Iran's musician Hossein Alizadeh. The film, which was a collaborative project by Iran, France, Austria and Iraq, was shot fully in Iranian Kurdistan. However, it narrates the story of a group of Iranian Kurdish musicians who would like to travel to Iraqi Kurdistan and organize a concert there.

In 2006, Index on Censorship gave Ghobadi an Index Film Award for making a significant contribution to freedom of expression through his film Turtles Can Fly.

In May 2009, his film No One Knows About Persian Cats won an Un Certain Regard Special Jury Prize ex-aequo when it premiered at the Cannes Film Festival. This film chronicles the hardships facing young Iranian musicians seeking to evade censorship.

In 2012, his next film Rhino Season was released at San Sebastian Film Festival. In this film he worked with Monica Belluci and combined an international cast. 

Following critical success of this film, he also took part as one of the directors in anthology film Words with Gods directing the segment Kaboki. 

In 2015, his feature documentary A Flag without a Country was released. The documentary that premiered at Sundance Film Festival is about Kurds, middle-east war and "Kurdistan", a nation with about 45m population and still without a country. 

Following this documentary, he got back on fiction and directed The Four Walls in which he again assembled an international cast featuring Amir Aghaee, Funda Eryiğit and Denizhan Akbaba

He is currently writing, directing, and producing, and actively participating in supporting human rights and freedom of speech all around the world.

Filmography

As director

As actor
Ghobadi made a cameo appearance in the 2019 film The Irishman, where he portrayed a prison cook who serves Jimmy Hoffa an ice cream sundae. While Ghobadi does not enjoy acting, he says he appeared in the film out of respect for Martin Scorsese and Al Pacino.

Jury Duties 
Ghobadi has served as jury president or jury member in many international festivals.  

 22nd Busan International Film Festival- New Currents Jury Member, Busan, South Korea, 12-21.10.2017
 7th Off Plus Camera International Festival of Independent Cinema, Poland, 2-11 May 2014
 14th International Film Festival of Kerala, December 2009
 The independent Film festival Off Camera Poland. 1-5 October 2008
 Eurasia International Film festival, Kazakhstan, 7-13 September, 2008
 Sao Paolo International Film Festival, October, 2006
 Anonimul International Film Festival, 14 to 19 August 2006
 Vila do conde International Film Festival, Portugal, 3 to 11 July, 2006
 Gwangju International Film Festival, Korea, 28 April to 6 May, 2006
 Rotterdam International Film Festival, 26 January to 6 February, 2004
 Cannes International Film Festival, Golden Shell district, 2002

Activism 

Ghobadi, as an exile filmmaker, initiated many campaigns for freedom of speech and freedom of expression. In 2021, he wrote a letter to the Academy of Motion Pictures Arts and Science to create an initiative to give exile directors possibility to submit their work for best International Film category.

He has also played an important role on social media during the protests in Iran following the event of Mahsa Amini's death in September 2022. He informed public and followers about the incidents happening in Iran, supporting the cause of Iranian people standing for themselves and agains oppressive Iranian regime. He has also wrote an open letter to Academy of Motion Picture Arts and Science to invite the film industry to support the democratic cause of his people.

References

External links

Profiling Bahman Qobadi
Mij Film
Index Film Award
Profiling Bahman Qobadi
An interview with Bahman Ghobadi, director of Half Moon September 26, 2006 with David Walsh and Joanne Laurier on the World Socialist Web Site

1969 births
Living people
People from Baneh
Iranian Kurdish people
Iranian film directors
Iranian screenwriters
Iranian male film actors
Kurdish film directors
Directors of Caméra d'Or winners